Henry Hatton was a Nova Scotia politician in the 19th century.

Henry Hatton may also refer to:

Henry Finch-Hatton, 13th Earl of Winchilsea (1852–1927), English peer
Henry Hatton (Irish politician), represented Fethard (County Wexford) (Parliament of Ireland constituency)
Henry Hatton (MP for Wexford), represented Wexford Borough (Parliament of Ireland constituency)